Looking for Mr. Goodbar is a 1977 American crime drama film, based on Judith Rossner's best-selling 1975 novel of the same name, which was inspired by the 1973 murder of New York City schoolteacher Roseann Quinn. The film was written and directed by Richard Brooks, and stars Diane Keaton, Tuesday Weld, William Atherton, Richard Kiley and Richard Gere.

The film was a commercial success, earning $22.5 million, and garnered two Academy Award nominations, Best Supporting Actress for Tuesday Weld and Best Cinematography for William A. Fraker.

Plot
Theresa Dunn (Diane Keaton), a young schoolteacher in Chicago, experiences her sexual awakening while searching for excitement outside her ordered life. While in college, she lives with her repressive Polish-Irish Catholic parents (Richard Kiley and Priscilla Pointer) and suffers from severe body image issues following a childhood surgery for scoliosis that left a large scar on her back. Theresa later finds out that her scoliosis is congenital, and that her aunt had the same condition and committed suicide. As a result, Theresa is reluctant to have children of her own.

Meanwhile, Theresa's beautiful "perfect" older sister, Katherine (Tuesday Weld), has left her husband and embarked on a wild lifestyle involving multiple affairs, a secret abortion, recreational drug use, and a short-lived marriage to a Jewish man. Theresa finds first love and loses her virginity to her much older, and married, college professor, Martin (Alan Feinstein). He ends their affair just before her graduation, leaving Theresa feeling used and lonely.

Theresa takes a job teaching deaf children and proves to be a gifted and caring teacher. With Katherine's encouragement, she moves into an apartment in Katherine's building. She frequents a bar at night where she meets Tony (Richard Gere), a charming but vain Italian-American. She ends up taking Tony to her apartment, taking cocaine with him and sleeping with him. Tony leaves in a hurry and gives her a Quaalude pill to counteract the cocaine. This causes her to oversleep and she arrives very late for work the next day, angering her employer and students. Tony then disappears for a long while, and Theresa initially misses him.

Through her job, Theresa also meets and dates an Irish-American welfare caseworker, James (William Atherton). Her parents approve of the responsible James, seeing him as a potential husband for Theresa. However, the couple do not have sex because James wants a traditional courtship and a monogamous relationship. Theresa sees this as stifling her freedom. Although James initially seems nice, over time he appears to become controlling and disrespectful of Theresa. Moreover, he shows signs of being just as selfish as Tony.

Meanwhile, Theresa begins to go out to more marginal places and has sex with complete strangers, often with older men. Tony eventually returns and acts as if nothing had happened. He barges in on Theresa while she is with another man and chases him away. Tony becomes controlling and abusive, and Theresa also discovers that he is a street hustler. She breaks up with Tony but he stalks and harasses her, both at home and at her workplace. After imagining what could happen if Tony were to turn her in to the police as revenge, Theresa gathers up all of the drugs in her apartment and flushes them down the toilet.

With the New Year approaching, Theresa resolves to turn over a new leaf and take control of her life. On New Year's Eve, she meets Gary (Tom Berenger) in a bar, and cajoles him into helping her avoid James. Gary has been living with his gay lover but lies to Theresa, telling her that he has a pregnant wife in Florida. When they are in bed together at her apartment, Gary finds himself unable to achieve an erection. He then sniffs a "popper". Theresa tells him that it is okay if they don't have sex but Gary misinterprets this as questioning his sexuality. In a rage, Gary attacks her, rapes her, and then stabs her repeatedly, killing her.

Cast

Soundtrack

Looking For Mr. Goodbar is the 1977 soundtrack album of the film of the same name.  The album includes numerous disco, R&B and rock tracks from the era reflective of the music being played in clubs and discos in that period, as well as the film's theme, "Don't Ask To Stay Until Tomorrow" (written by Carol Connors and Artie Kane), presented in both vocal and instrumental versions.

Production
For the sex scenes, Richard Brooks closed the set to all but essential crew. Diane Keaton still had difficulty the first time she was required to appear naked. When she heard Richard playing a Bach record during lunch, she asked if he could play the record during her scene. "Diane is so shy," he said later. "She could only do a nude scene if she was playing to the music. She couldn't play to a man. I think Bach would have been pleased."

Reception
The film opened to mixed reviews, but solid box office. Many critics praised Diane Keaton's performance. On Rotten Tomatoes the film has a 63% rating based on reviews from 30 critics. The site's consensus states: "Diane Keaton gives an absolutely fearless performance in a sexual thriller whose ending will leave audiences trembling."

Some critics found the film lurid and muddled; a review by Frank Rich for Time magazine criticized Brooks for making "many crude miscalculations" in adapting the novel. Roger Ebert gave the film 3 out of 4 stars, praising Keaton's performance but lamenting the "many loose ends and dead ends," some of which he blamed on significant alterations to the novel's plot. Gene Siskel also awarded 3 out of 4 stars, writing that "Keaton is absolutely compelling in 'Looking for Mr. Goodbar,' even when the film is not." Vincent Canby of The New York Times agreed that Keaton was "virtually the only reason" to see the film, calling her "too good to waste on the sort of material the movie provides, which is artificial without in anyway qualifying as a miracle fabric." Charles Champlin of the Los Angeles Times called Keaton's performance "high among the year's finest" in a demanding role, and declared the film "powerful, sincere and overlong, and if the film raises questions about itself it is also thought-provoking." John Simon noted that while the novel is set in New York City, the film is said to be located in San Francisco (though identifiably filmed in Chicago's Rush Street neighborhood). He also noted that "the main character is made considerably prettier, thus reducing the principal sources of her insecurity", as compared to her portrayal in the novel as somewhat of a "Plain Jane". Pauline Kael noted, "Richard Brooks [...] has laid a windy jeremiad about our permissive society on top of fractured film syntax. He's lost the erotic, pulpy morbidity that made the novel a compulsive read; the film is splintered, moralistic, tedious."

Author Judith Rossner praised Keaton's performance. However, she had nothing to do with the making of the film and "detested" the final product.

Box office
Looking For Mr Goodbar grossed $1,540,635 from 110 theaters in its opening weekend. Variety listed the film at number one at the US box office for the week based on their sample of 20-22 cities, however, Star Wars grossed more for the weekend. After 16 days, the film expanded into 169 theatres and after 26 days of release it had grossed $8,128,345 and had spent another two weeks atop the US box office.

Scientific analysis
Robert O. Friedel, MD, has suggested that Theresa's behavior in the film is consistent with a diagnosis of borderline personality disorder.

Legacy
Looking for Mr. Goodbar introduced Richard Gere, LeVar Burton and Tom Berenger, all as men whom Theresa encounters. And in one bar scene, Keaton is reading a paperback version of The Godfather, which was adapted in the classic movie in which she co-starred.

Home video releases
While the film was released on LaserDisc and VHS, it has never been officially released on DVD or Blu-ray.

In popular culture
The film is referenced in the Frank Zappa song "Dancin’ Fool" from the 1979 album "Sheik Yerbouti"

The film is referenced in the 1985 "Weird Al" Yankovic song "Dare to Be Stupid" in which Yankovic advises the listener in one lyric to "look for Mr. Goodbar."

The film inspired the music video for the 1993 Madonna song "Bad Girl".  In the video, Madonna plays a woman who, like Theresa, engages in self-destructive behavior by drinking heavily and sleeping around with random men before she is ultimately murdered by a man she had selected for a one-night stand.

The film was referenced in the "Homer Badman" episode of The Simpsons. When Homer and Marge are at a candy convention, an announcement over the PA system says "Looking for Mr. Goodbar, the front desk is Looking for Mr. Goodbar".

Awards
Tuesday Weld received a nomination for Best Supporting Actress, and William A. Fraker received a nomination for Best Cinematography at the 50th Academy Awards.

Diane Keaton was nominated for the Golden Globe Award for Best Actress (Drama) and the New York Film Critics Circle Award for Best Actress. (She was not nominated for an Academy Award for this film, but she did win Best Actress the same year for Annie Hall.)

Director Richard Brooks was nominated for "Best Drama Adapted from Another Medium" from the Writers Guild of America.

Notes

See also
 Closing Time: The True Story of the Goodbar Murder
 Mr. Goodbar
 Trackdown: Finding the Goodbar Killer, a made-for-TV semi-sequel that more or less follows the events of this film.
 List of films featuring the deaf and hard of hearing

References

External links
 
 
 

1977 films
1977 crime drama films
1977 LGBT-related films
Adultery in films
American crime drama films
American LGBT-related films
Borderline personality disorder in fiction
Casual sex in films
Crime films based on actual events
Drama films based on actual events
1970s English-language films
Films about Catholicism
Films about domestic violence
Films about drugs
Films about dysfunctional families
Films about educators
Films about rape
Films about sisters
Films based on American novels
Films directed by Richard Brooks
Films scored by Artie Kane
Films set in Chicago
Films shot in Chicago
Films shot in Los Angeles
LGBT-related drama films
Murder in films
Films set around New Year
Paramount Pictures films
1970s American films
Films about disability